The Anthony River, part of the Pieman River catchment, is a perennial river in the West Coast region of Tasmania, Australia.

Location and features
The river rises below the Tyndall Range on the northern slopes of the West Coast Range and drains Lake Huntley. The river flows east of Mount Murchison then north through Lake Rolleston before heading northwest and flowing through Lake Plimsoll. Thereafter the river flows northeast where it reaches its confluence with the Murchison River within Lake Murchison.

The river was dammed and combined with the waters of the Henty River for a minor hydro electric scheme, that followed the failure of the Hydro Tasmania plans to dam the Franklin and Gordon rivers.

The river also drains the glacial lakes of the northern end of the West Coast Range, and the Tyndalls.

See also

References

Rivers of Tasmania
West Coast Range
Pieman River Power Development